Richmond Harold Shreve (June 25, 1877 – September 11, 1946) was a Canadian-American architect.

Biography
He was born on June 25, 1877 in Cornwallis, Nova Scotia, the son of Richmond Shreve, an Anglican priest, and Mary Catherine Parker Hocken. Shreve attended Cornell University, taught there from 1902 to 1906, and was a member of the Sphinx Head Society.

He was president of the American Institute of Architects from 1941 through 1943.

He died on September 11, 1946 in Hastings-on-Hudson, New York.

Legacy
His company Shreve, Lamb and Harmon led the construction of the Empire State Building as well as several Cornell University buildings.  Shreve was also the lead architect for the landmark 1937 Williamsburg Houses housing development in Brooklyn.

He was profiled in the book The 100 Most Notable Cornellians.

Notes

External links 
 Richmond H. Shreve, William F. Lamb and Arthur L. Harmon, photographed in 1941.

1877 births
1946 deaths
Canadian architects
Architects from New York (state)
People from Annapolis County, Nova Scotia
Cornell University College of Architecture, Art, and Planning alumni
Fellows of the American Institute of Architects
Presidents of the American Institute of Architects
Canadian emigrants to the United States